Hidden (often stylized as ĦỊĐĐỂŅ) is the second studio album by British art rock band These New Puritans. Featuring a wider sonic palette than previous work and sections played by a Czech orchestra, it was produced by frontman Jack Barnett and former Bark Psychosis leader Graham Sutton during 2009. Before their second album Hidden was released, Barnett revealed that he had been writing music for bassoon and stated that the aim was for a final product where "dancehall meets Steve Reich". Barnett learned music notation in order to write the classical parts of the album, especially the brass and woodwind audio tracks. The mixing process was undertaken by Dave Cooley, who had previously focused on alternative hip hop and shoegazing artists, in Los Angeles using Barnett's input. Angular Recording Corporation and Domino Records released Hidden in most territories on 18 January 2010; the North American release date was 2 March. Angular's press release describes the album as including:

Six-foot Japanese Taiko drums, a thirteen piece brass and woodwind ensemble, sub-heavy beats, prepared piano, a children’s choir, Foley recording techniques (including a melon with cream crackers attached struck by a hammer, used to simulate the sound of a human head being smashed), and the ethereal voice of Heather Marlatt from dream-pop group Salem.

Hidden was voted NME album of the year for 2010.

Track listing
All songs written by Jack Barnett, unless otherwise stated.

Charts

References

These New Puritans albums
Domino Recording Company albums
2010 albums
Angular Recording Corporation albums